Mikaela Irene Dimaano Fudolig (born 1991 or 1992) is a Filipino physicist and former child prodigy. She is known for earning her undergraduate degree at the age of 16.

Life and career 
Fudolig was a sophomore at Quezon City Science High School before being pulled into the experimental Early College Placement Program (ECPP). At the age of 11, she began her university education at the University of the Philippines Diliman (UP Diliman). She was admitted without a high school diploma and without taking the UP College Admission Test (UPCAT).

In 2007, at 16 years old, Fudolig graduated with a bachelor's degree in physics, summa cum laude, from UP Diliman. With a general weighted average of 1.099, she was the class valedictorian. She then joined the faculty of the National Institute of Physics after graduation.

She earned her Master of Science degree in physics, and in 2014 her PhD from UP Diliman with her dissertation entitled, "Analytic treatment of consensus achievement in two-level opinion dynamics models of completely connected agents with single-type zealots." She was also a Fulbright scholar for doctoral enrichment in behavioral economics at the University of California, Irvine, where she was under the supervision of Donald G. Saari.

Fudolig has worked as a research and development specialist for the Energy Development Corporation (EDC), and as an assistant professor at Ateneo de Manila University from 2016 to 2017. She is currently a postdoctoral researcher at the University of Vermont. Previously, she was a postdoctoral researcher at the Asia Pacific Center for Theoretical Physics from 2018 to 2020. 

In 2016, Fudolig was admitted to the University of the Philippines College of Law. She remains a researcher at the University of Vermont, and unable to obtain a full-time, tenure-based position in the U.S. because her degrees are all from the Philippines.

Selected publications 

 Fudolig, M. I. D.; Esguerra, J. P. H. (2014). Analytic treatment of consensus achievement in the single-type zealotry voter model. Physica A: Statistical Mechanics and its Applications. 413: 626–634.
 Alshaabi, T., Van Oort, C., Fudolig, M., Arnold, M. V., Danforth, C. M., & Dodds, P. S. (2021). Augmenting semantic lexicons using word embeddings and transfer learning. ArXiv:2109.09010 [Physics]. http://arxiv.org/abs/2109.09010
 Dodds, P. S., Alshaabi, T., Fudolig, M. I., Zimmerman, J. W., Lovato, J., Beaulieu, S., Minot, J. R., Arnold, M. V., Reagan, A. J., & Danforth, C. M. (2021). Ousiometrics and Telegnomics: The essence of meaning conforms to a two-dimensional powerful-weak and dangerous-safe framework with diverse corpora presenting a safety bias. ArXiv:2110.06847 [Physics]. http://arxiv.org/abs/2110.06847
 Fudolig, M. I., Alshaabi, T., Arnold, M. V., Danforth, C. M., & Dodds, P. S. (2021). Sentiment and structure in word co-occurrence networks on Twitter. ArXiv:2110.00587 [Physics]. http://arxiv.org/abs/2110.00587

References 
Notes

References

External links
 Fudolig's profile at the Ateneo de Manila University website 
 Fudolig's compilation of speeches 

Living people
Filipino women academics
1990s births
Filipino physicists
University of the Philippines Diliman alumni
Academic staff of the University of the Philippines
Academic staff of Ateneo de Manila University